Brief Interviews with Hideous Men is a 2009 American comedy-drama film written, produced, and directed by John Krasinski, in his directorial debut. Based on a  short story collection of the same name by David Foster Wallace.

Plot
Sara Quinn (Julianne Nicholson) copes with a recent breakup by interviewing men as part of her graduate studies. Her intellectual endeavor has emotional consequences as the men’s twisted and revealing stories are juxtaposed against the backdrop of her own experience. As she begins to listen closely to the men around her, Sara must ultimately reconcile herself to the darkness that lies below the surface of human interactions.

Cast
 Julianne Nicholson as Sara Quinn
 Josh Charles as Subject #2
 Christopher Meloni as R / Subject #3
 Will Arnett as Subject #11
 Ben Shenkman as Subject #14
 Michael Cerveris as Subject #15
 Chris Messina as Subject #19
 John Krasinski as Ryan / Subject #20
 Ben Gibbard as Harry / Subject #20
 Lou Taylor Pucci as Evan / Subject #28
 Max Minghella as Kevin / Subject #28
 Timothy Hutton as Prof. Adams / Subject #30
 Clarke Peters as Subject #31
 Bobby Cannavale as Subject #40
 Frankie Faison as Subject #42
 Dominic Cooper as Daniel / Subject #46
 Corey Stoll as Subject #51
 Joey Slotnick as Tad / Subject #59
 Will Forte as Subject #72
 Rashida Jones as Hannah

Production
The film was shot in studios in Brooklyn, New York and exterior filming took place in Staten Island, New York, and on the campuses of Columbia University and Brooklyn College.

Reception
On review aggregator Rotten Tomatoes, the film holds an approval rating of 40% based on 40 reviews, with an average rating of 5.02/10. The website's critics consensus reads: "Ambitious but uneven, John Krasinski's adaptation of David Foster Wallace's Brief Interviews with Hideous Men tries hard but doesn't match the depth of the book." On Metacritic, the film has a weighted average score of 44 out of 100, based on 16 critics, indicating "mixed or average reviews". The film was selected for the US Dramatic Competition in the 2009 Sundance Film Festival.

References

External links
 
 
 John Krasinski Interview at AMCtv.com

2009 films
2000s English-language films
Films directed by John Krasinski
2009 comedy-drama films
Films based on short fiction
Films with screenplays by John Krasinski
Films shot in New York (state)
American comedy-drama films
2009 directorial debut films
2000s American films